Pagurodofleinia doederleini is a species of hermit crab in the genus Pagurodofleinia. The species lives the deep Pacific sea-floor of Japan at depths of 100 to 400 meters. It lives in a symbiotic relationship with a carcinoecium-forming sea anemone called Stylobates calcifer. Stylobates calcifer rest on top of Pagurodofleinia deoderleini where it forms a thin shell around Pagurodofleinia doederlenini.

Reference 

Hermit crabs